Plouhinec is a commune in the Finistère department of Brittany in north-western France.

The commune lies on the road from Pont-l'Abbé to Audierne.

Landmarks in the town include the Saint-Winoc Church, which dates from the sixteenth century, and the scenic, small natural port of the borough of Pors-Poulhan. Its smooth white-sand beaches with their light surf are ideal for families with children.

The village contains sculptures by locally born artist René Quillivic.

Population

Gallery

See also
Communes of the Finistère department

References

The information in this article is based on a translation of its German equivalent.

External links

Official website 

Mayors of Finistère Association 

Communes of Finistère
Populated coastal places in France